The Spalacidae, or spalacids, are a family of rodents in the large and complex superfamily Muroidea. They are native to eastern Asia, the Horn of Africa, the Middle East, and southeastern Europe. It includes the blind mole-rats, bamboo rats, mole-rats, and zokors.  This family represents the oldest split (excluding perhaps the Platacanthomyidae) in the muroid superfamily, and comprises animals adapted to a subterranean way of life.  These rodents were thought to have evolved adaptations to living underground independently until recent genetic studies demonstrated they form a monophyletic group.  Members of the Spalacidae are often placed in the family Muridae along with all other members of the Muroidea.

Characteristics
Spalacids are mouse- to rat-sized rodents, adapted to burrowing and living underground. They have short limbs, wedge-shaped skulls, strong neck muscles, large incisor teeth, and small eyes and external ears. In the zokors, which dig primarily with their feet, rather than their teeth, the front claws are also massively enlarged. These features are least extreme in the bamboo rats, which spend at least some of their time above ground, foraging for food. They are most highly developed in the blind mole-rats, whose eyes are completely covered by skin, and entirely lack external ears or tails.

All of the spalacid species dig extensive burrows, which may include storage chambers for food, latrine chambers, and breeding nests. They are generally solitary animals, and do not share their tunnel complexes with other individuals. All the species  are herbivores, feeding on roots, bulbs, and tubers.

They give birth to litters of up to six young after a gestation period  between three and seven weeks, depending on the species. As with many other muroids, the young are born blind, hairless, and helpless. They may stay with the mother for several months before setting off to establish their own burrows, although some species disperse as soon as they are weaned.

Characteristics
Norris et al. listed several characteristics present in all members of this family which distinguish them from the rest of the muroids, (the clade Eumuroida). These are "the reduction or absence of external eyes, reduced pinnae, stocky body, short tail (<50% head and body length), broad rostrum, triangular-shaped braincase, infraorbital canal ovoid shape and does not extend ventrally to the roof of the palate, zygomatic plate absent or much reduced, nasolacrimal canal inside infraorbital canal, incisive foramina small to medium-sized, extensive neck musculature and prominent points of attachment on the occipitum, minimal reduction in M3 relative to M1 and M2, and a distinct orientation of the manubrium of the malleus bone."

Classification
The spalacids are classified in three subfamilies, six genera, and 37 species.

Family Spalacidae
Subfamily Myospalacinae - zokors
Genus Myospalax
Myospalax myospalax species group
False zokor, M. aspalax
Siberian zokor, M. myospalax
Myospalax psilurus species group
Transbaikal zokor, M. psilurus
Genus Eospalax
Chinese zokor, E. fontanierii
Rothschild's zokor, E. rothschildi
Smith's zokor, E. smithii
Subfamily Rhizomyinae
Tribe Rhizomyini - bamboo rats
Genus Rhizomys
Hoary bamboo rat, R. pruinosus
Chinese bamboo rat, R. sinensis
Large bamboo rat, R. sumatrensis
Genus Cannomys
Lesser bamboo rat, C. badius
†Genus Brachyrhizomys (Miocene to Pleistocene)
Tribe Tachyoryctini
Genus Tachyoryctes - African mole-rats
Ankole African mole-rat, T. ankoliae
Mianzini African mole-rat, T. annectens
Aberdare Mountains African mole-rat, T. audax
Demon African mole-rat, T. daemon
Kenyan African mole-rat, T. ibeanus
Big-headed African mole-rat, T. macrocephalus
Navivasha African mole-rat, Tachyoryctes naivashae
King African mole-rat, T. rex
Rwanda African mole-rat, T. ruandae
Rudd's African mole-rat, T. ruddi
Embi African mole-rat, T. spalacinus
Northeast African mole-rat, T. splendens
Storey's African mole-rat, T. storeyi
Subfamily Spalacinae - blind mole-rats
Genus Spalax
 Mehely's blind mole-rat, S. antiquus
 Sandy blind mole-rat, S. arenarius
 Giant blind mole-rat, S. giganteus
 Bukovina blind mole-rat, S. graecus
 Oltenia blind mole-rat, S. istricus (possibly extinct)
 Greater blind mole-rat, S. microphthalmus
 Kazakhstan blind mole-rat, S. uralensis
 Podolsk blind mole-rat, S. zemni
Genus Nannospalax - small-bodied mole-rats
Subgenus Nannospalax
Middle East blind mole-rat or Palestine mole-rat, N. ehrenbergi
Subgenus Mesospalax
Lesser blind mole-rat, N. leucodon
Anatolian blind mole-rat or Nehring's blind mole-rat, N. xanthodon

References

Jansa, S. A. and M. Weksler. 2004. Phylogeny of muroid rodents: relationships within and among major lineages as determined by IRBP gene sequences.  Molecular Phylogenetics and Evolution, 31:256-276.
Michaux, J., A. Reyes, and F. Catzeflis. 2001. Evolutionary history of the most speciose mammals: molecular phylogeny of muroid rodents. Molecular Biology and Evolution, 17:280-293.
Steppan, S. J., R. A. Adkins, and J. Anderson. 2004. Phylogeny and divergence date estimates of rapid radiations in muroid rodents based on multiple nuclear genes. Systematic Biology, 53:533-553.

 
Rodent families
Muroid rodents
Extant Miocene first appearances
Taxa named by John Edward Gray